OPA anhydrase may refer to:
 Diisopropyl-fluorophosphatase, an enzyme
 Aryldialkylphosphatase, an enzyme